{{DISPLAYTITLE:C16H14O7}}
The chemical formula C16H14O7 can refer to:

 Cedeodarin
 1,3-Dihydroxy-2,4,7-trimethoxyxanthone
 1,6-Dihydroxy-3,4,7-trimethoxyxanthone
 1,8-Dihydroxy-3,4,7-trimethoxyxanthone
 Filifolin
 Lecanoric acid
 8-Methoxyeriodictyol
 Mycochromone
 Padmatin
 Ulocladol